Ñochaco Airport  is an airport serving Puerto Octay in the Los Lagos Region of Chile. Ñochaco is in the countryside  north of Puerto Octay.

The runway has  of grass overrun on the south end.

See also

Transport in Chile
List of airports in Chile

References

External links
OpenStreetMap - Ñochaco
OurAirports - Ñochaco
FallingRain - Ñochaco Airport

Airports in Chile
Airports in Los Lagos Region